The Microsoft Surface Laptop 5 is the company's latest laptop computer developed to supersede the Surface Laptop 4. The device was announced on October 12, 2022 introducing 2 new colors and alongside the Surface Pro 9 and Surface Studio 2 Plus. The laptop is powered by the new Windows 11 operating system with the 2022 update and the 12th generation Intel Core processors.

Hardware 
 Powered by Evo 12th Generation Intel Core only.
 Up to 18 hours of battery with the 13-inch model and up to 17 hours with the 15-inch model.
 13-inch and 15-inch touchscreen with 3:2 aspect ratio, and 60Hz refresh rate
 USB A and USB C port with Thunderbolt 4
 Up to 1TB of SSD storage, with no microSD slot for expansion
 Up to 32GB of memory

Timeline

References 

5
Computer-related introductions in 2021